Piazza del Duomo is a city square in L'Aquila, Italy.

Buildings around the square 
 L'Aquila Cathedral
 Santa Maria del Suffragio, L'Aquila

References

External links 

Piazzas in L'Aquila